"Dumela" means "hello" in Sotho language. It may also refer to:

Places
Dumela, village in Chicualacuala District
Dumela Industrial Complex Francistown
NTWA Dumela Investments Marikana land occupation

Music
Dumela (band), Dave Matthews Band Peter Griesar Calgary Folk Music Festival
Dumela (album), album of South African hip hop artist Hip Hop Pantsula 2010

Songs
"Dumela", by Mahlathini & the Mahotella Queens Composed by David Masondo
"Dumela", song by Carolyn Malachi Ben Carver / Carolyn Malachi / Reagan Carver from soundtrack album of My Last Day Without You